Abdullah bin Abdul Rahman Al Hussein is a Saudi engineer. He has been the minister of water and electricity since 2004.

Education
Al Hussein obtained a bachelor of science degree in electrical engineering in 1973. He received a master of science degree in computer science from Georgia Institute of Technology in 1976.

Career
Al Hussein began his career as a lecturer at King Saud University and served there from 1974 to 1977. He served as the director of the computer department at the Saline Water Conversion Corporation from 1977 to 1980. Next, he worked as the director of the operation and maintenance department at the same institution from 1980 to 1985. Al Hussein was named as the governor of the Saline Water Conversion Corporation in 2001 and his term lasted until 2003. He served as the deputy board chairman of the water and electricity company from 2003 to 2004. He has been minister of water and electricity since 13 April 2004.

References

20th-century scholars
20th-century Saudi Arabian engineers
21st-century Saudi Arabian engineers
Living people
Georgia Tech alumni
Government ministers of Saudi Arabia
Academic staff of King Saud University
Year of birth missing (living people)